The , also pronounced kanko,  is a type of spirit possession in legends around various parts of Japan. It may be known otherwise as osaki especially in the Kantō region, and also considered equivalent to the izuna.

It was believed to assume the guise of a small mammal and able to fit inside a pipe or bamboo tube, but normally only its keeper or user (kitsune-tsukai) was able to see it. The user, through the power of the kuda, was believed capable of divulging a person's past or foretelling his future; this soothsayer was also capable of performing curses, bringing calamity upon targets. In regions where the superstition was held, a prospering household could be accused of achieving its prosperity because it was a house possessed by the spirit (kuda-tsuki). The fox (and its analogues by other names) was said to multiply in number each time a marriage took place, following the bride to her place of marriage, thus disseminating into more households.

Nomenclature 

The  , which in Chinese fashion (onyomi)  can also be read as kanko (old romanization kwanko), derives its name from being small enough to fit inside a tube, according to one explanation. It may also have earned its name due to its tail resembling a tube spliced in two. Folklorist Yanagita Kunio conjectured that the kuda alluded to a god's descent (verb: kudaru) from the mountain, this god  Ta-no-Kami ("rice paddy god") being roughly equated with the Yama-no-Kami or "mountain god".

Aliases 

The  osaki fox is also identified as an equivalent spirit employed by the "fox-user" (kitsune tsukai).

According to one summarization, the term  is prevalent in the central region (Chūbu region, around Nagoya), whereas the appellation izuna tends to be used in the northeast (Tōhoku), and osaki in the northern Kantō region.

Geography 
The kuda-gitsune lore is found in Nagano Prefecture, and Chūbu region and parts of the Tōkai region (Mikawa and Tōtomi Provinces of old), southern Kantō region, Tōhoku region, and so on. There are no legends of kudagitsune in Kantō besides the Chiba Prefecture and Kanagawa Prefecture, and this is said to be because Kantō is the domain of the osaki fox.

These lore of the kanko (kuda-gitsune) are also said to be numerous in the northern mountains of Suruga, Tōtōmi, and Mikawa Provinces.

General description 

The  (1850) also provided visual illustration of a specific anecdotal example, which reportedly had a catlike face, otter-like body, gray-colored fur, and was about the size of a squirrel, with a thick tail.

And according to 's essay collection  (pub. 1850), the  kanko/kuda-gitsune is about the size of a weasel with vertical eyes, but otherwise the same as a feral rat (or perhaps rather the yako), except its thick fur is not all matted/dissheveled.

Modern sources describe it to be the size of a house mouse, or about the size of a matchbox.

The fox user (kitsune-tsukai) may also keep the tamed kuda fox spirit in the bosom  of his garment ("pocket") or up his sleeve, and the creature collects assorted information which it whispers to its master's ear, so that the practitioner of the art may then reveal another's history, or predict another's future. The spirit remains invisible, and can be only seen by the user. Or it is said that the fox in the bamboo tube may be summoned by reciting a magical incantation, and be made to answer any questions asked.

The ability of using the kanko/kudagitsune is obtained from Mount Kinpu the ascetics of shugendō (commonly called yamabushi) after undergoing rigorous ascetic training, or so it is reported in the Zen'an zuihitsu.

Izuna  

An izuna is a fox servant, employed by certain "sorcerers" called izuna-tsukai (izuna users) in the Shinano Region (Nagano Prefecture);  these familiars may also be employed by other psychic type religious of spiritual professionals in Niigata Prefecture and other parts of the Northeast, as well as in the Chūbu region, and those who profess to have special powers claim to perform clairvoyancy with the use of the izuna. The sorcerer was also believed capable of harming his client's enemies using the izuna, causing them to become possessed or to fall ill.

Therefore, the sorcerer (izuna-tsukai) sometimes may be a worshipper of this particular gongen deity, however, that is not always the case.

Kitsune-tsuki 

Such a family, though they main amass wealth is seen to have achieved it by striking fear among others by its fox-using, and marriage with a fox-user household was shunned by the rest. The kuda-gitsune were allegedly commanded by its master to raid other families' homes and stealing their possessions, and in this way the master's family grows wealthy―or at least in the beginning. Since the kuda-gitsune multiplies until their number grows to 75, the large pack of foxes eat away at the family's wealth bringing about their downfall.

As for the foxes quickly multiplying to 75, it is also said that every time a bride from a kuda or osaki-haunted household goes off to be married, she is said to bring 75 of the kuda minions along with her into the new household. This piece of folklore was perhaps invented as a convenient explanation as to why so many families came to be accused of being fox-owners, as time went by.

Explanatory notes

References 
Citations

Bibliography

 
 
 
 
 
  e-text
 
 ;
  -- (1998). Univ of Hawaii Pr; Illustrated edition  (12/1). ISBN 978-0824821029
 ; e-text

External links
Illustration of a Kuda-kitsune emerging from a pipe

Kitsune (fox)
Legendary mammals